Musa viridis is a species of wild banana (genus Musa), native to northern Vietnam. It is placed in section Callimusa (now including the former section Australimusa), members of which have a diploid chromosome number of 2n = 20.

References

viridis
Plants described in 2004
Endemic flora of Vietnam